This is a list of Cypriot football transfers for the 2013–14 summer transfer window by club. Only transfers of clubs in the Cypriot First Division and Cypriot Second Division are included.

The summer transfer window opened on 1 June 2013, although a few transfers took place prior to that date. The window closed at midnight on 31 August 2013. Players without a club may join one at any time, either during or in between transfer windows.

Cypriot First Division

AEK Kouklia

In:

Out:

AEK Larnaca

In:

Out:

AEL Limassol

In:

Out:

Alki Larnaca

In:

Out:

Anorthosis Famagusta

In:

Out:

APOEL

In:

Out:

Apollon Limassol

In:

Out:

Aris Limassol

In:

Out:

Doxa Katokopias

In:

Out:

Enosis Neon Paralimni

In:

Out:

Ermis Aradippou

In:

Out:

Ethnikos Achna

In:

Out:

Nea Salamina

In:

Out:

Omonia

In:

Out:

Cypriot Second Division

B1 Division

AEP Paphos

In:

Out:

Anagennisi Dherynia

In:

Out:

APEP Pitsilia

In:

Out:

Ayia Napa

In:

Out:

Nikos & Sokratis Erimis

In:

Out:

Olympiakos Nicosia

In:

Out:

Omonia Aradippou

In:

Out:

Othellos Athienou

In:

Out:

B2 Division

AEZ Zakakiou

In:

Out:

ASIL Lysi

In:

Out:

Chalkanoras Idaliou

In:

Out:

Digenis Voroklinis

In:

Out:

Enosis Neon Parekklisia

In:

Out:

Karmiotissa Polemidion

In:

Out:

Onisilos Sotira

In:

Out:

PAEEK FC

In:

Out:

See also
  I-League transfers for the 2013–14 season
  List of Bulgarian football transfers summer 2013
  List of Dutch football transfers summer 2013
  List of English football transfers summer 2013
  List of Maltese football transfers summer 2013
  List of German football transfers summer 2013
  List of Greek football transfers summer 2013
  List of Portuguese football transfers summer 2013
  List of Spanish football transfers summer 2013
  List of Latvian football transfers summer 2013
  List of Serbian football transfers summer 2013

References

Cypriot
Transfers
Cypriot football transfers